Linnaeus University (LNU) is a state university in the Swedish historical province (landskap) Småland, with two campuses located in Växjö and Kalmar respectively. Linnaeus University was established in 2010 by a merger of former Växjö University and Kalmar University (Högskolan i Kalmar), and is named in honour of the Swedish botanist Carl Linnaeus.

History 
Växjö University began as a local department of Lund University in 1967. The department became an independent university college in 1970 and was granted full university status in 1999.

Kalmar University was similarly a university college, founded in 1977. Though not a university by the Swedish definition, it had been entitled to issue doctoral degrees in the natural sciences since 1999.

Logo
The university's logo is a stylized tree. The origin is a drawing made by the Swedish scientist Carl Linnaeus taken from his 1725 publication Örtabok. While the tree is said to be a symbol  of May and to represent the power of growth, it also symbolizes the university's ambition to be a global university with the region as its base and the world as its arena.

Faculties and schools

Faculties 
Faculty of arts and humanities.
Faculty of health and life sciences. 
Faculty of social sciences. 
Faculty of technology. 
The school of business and economics - received AACSB accreditation in 2022. 
Board of teacher education.

Departments 
 Department of Accounting and Logistics
 Department of Biology and Environmental Science
 Department of Building Technology
 Department of Built Environment and Energy Technology
 Department of Chemistry and Biomedical Sciences
 Department of Computer Science and Media Technology
 Department of Design
 Department of Economics and Statistics
 Department of Education and Teachers' Practice
 Department of Film and Literature
 Department of Forestry and Wood Technology
 Department of Health and Caring Sciences
 Department of Informatics
 Department of Languages
 Department of Marketing and Tourism Studies
 Department of Mathematics
 Department of Mechanical Engineering
 Department of Media and Journalism
 Department of Medicine and Optometry
 Department of Music and Art
 Department of Organisation and Entrepreneurship
 Department of Pedagogy and Learning
 Department of Physics and Electrical Engineering
 Department of Political Science
 Department of Psychology
 Department of Social Studies
 Department of Social Work
 Department of Sport Science
 Department of Swedish
 Kalmar Maritime Academy

Other institutes 
 Institute for Further Education of Journalists
 Institute of Police Education
 Centre for Gender Studies
 Centre for School Development and Educational Leadership

University Administration 
 Communications Office
 Executive Office
 Finance Office
 IT Office
 Office of External Relations
 Office of Facilities Management and Services
 Office of Human Resources 
 Office of Student Affairs
 University Library

Campus 
There are two campuses, one in Växjö and one in Kalmar.

Kalmar
The Department of Biology and Environmental Science in Kalmar has special competence in the area of life, health and the environment. The School offers Master’s programmes.

Växjö 
The campus is located just outside Växjö city center. It was designed in the American campus style, meaning that all teaching premises are within walking distance. The campus borders a nature conservation area.

There are 3,700 student apartments and dorm rooms on the university campus housing approximately 4,600-5,200 students. A part of the university campus is dedicated to the Videum Science Park. The park gives space to over 100 companies, thus being close to the university it encourages innovation and research.

Teaching premises and accommodation stand side by side on the campus. There are also restaurants, cafés, bars, a sports centre and a variety of service facilities. The campus offers a safe, relaxed environment despite the high level of activity. It is bordered by meadows, a nature conservation area, a lake with bird-watching towers, and Teleborg Castle.

Department of Biology and Environmental Science
The Department of Biology and Environmental Science is part of the Faculty of Health and Life Sciences. Scientists working at the department are involved in research and teaching activities in Biology, Biomedical Science, Pharmacy, Chemistry, Food Science, and Environmental Science. Most of the research laboratories and classes are operated in Kalmar. It offers seven Bachelor programs (in Swedish) and four Master programs.

A non-comprehensive list of the research group operating with the school include:
 Applied biochemistry research group (Prof. Sten Ohlson)
 Bioorganic and Biophysical Chemistry Laboratory (Prof. Ian A. Nicholls)
 Nutrient sensing and phosphate transport in Saccharomyces cerevisiae. Biochemistry Research Group (Prof. Bengt Persson)
 Computational Chemistry and Biochemistry Research Group (Dr. Ran Friedman)
 Environmental Engineering and Recovery Department (Prof. William Hogland)
 Marine Ecology Research Group (Prof. Edna Graneli)
 Plant Biochemistry/Plant Biotechnology Research Group (Prof.Peter Brodelius)
 Virology Research Group (Prof. Michael Lindberg)
 Zoonotic Ecology Research Group (Dr. Jonas Waldenström)

Notable alumni
Rolph Payet - Seychellois Cabinet Minister
Malik Bendjelloul - Director of Academy Award-winning documentary Searching for Sugar Man
Andriy Tsaplienko, Ukrainian journalist

See also 
 List of universities in Sweden

References

External links

 Linnaeus University - official site
 VIS - official site

Linnaeus University
Educational institutions established in 2010